Guru Nanak National College (GNNC) is situated at the by- pass  Jalandhar, Punjab, India. Established in 1969, it is one of the oldest educational Institutes in the Doaba region of Punjab. 

The College is named after Guru Nanak Dev, the first of the ten Sikh Gurus. This institute was established for the 500 th birth celebration of Guru Nanak Dev Ji. Founding  members included S.Darbara Singh Ex Speaker Punjab Assembly, S.Umrao Singh Sports minister Punjab, S.Darshan Singh Chairman Mandi Board Punjab , S.Rameshwar Singh and S.Kishan Singh Sarpanch Sarakpur Nakodar. Founding Principal was S.Balwant Singh. Initial faculty included
English
Prof R.S Sehgal
Prof D.V. Gupta
Prof Narinder Verma Of Sarih
Punjabi
Prof Vir Singh Randhawa (who Later Became Principal after Retirement of Principal Balwant Singh)
Prof Surjit Singh Of Shankar
History
Prof Amritpal Singh Toor
Chemistry
Prof Ajit Singh
Physics
Prof Harbhajan Singh Kale Sangha.
Mathematics
Prof Baldev Raj (who later joined IAS)
Prof Dilbagh Singh (who became President of Union of College Teachers and died at young age in a car accident)
Economics 
Prof Ajaib Singh.
DPI 
Mr. Narinder Sharma

Courses offered
B.A.
B.Sc.(Non-Medical)
B.Sc.(Medical)
B.Sc.(Computer Science)
B.Sc.(Economics)
B.C.A.
B.Com. from session 2012-13
M.Sc.(Computer Science) from session 2012-13
P.G.D.C.A.
I.T.I Courses
Electrician
A.C. & Refrigerator
Basic Computer

NCC, NSS and other clubs

NCC
NSS
Youth Club
Red Ribbon Club
Science Club
I.T. Club

External links
 
 
 

Universities and colleges in Punjab, India
Memorials to Guru Nanak